Free Jimmy (No: Slipp Jimmy fri) is a 2006 adult computer-animated comedy film first released in Norwegian in 2006, and later in English in 2008. The film was written and directed by acclaimed Norwegian subculture comic book artist Christopher Nielsen and features a number of characters from Nielsen's dark humor-laden comic books. The plot is an adult-oriented black comedy in which different groups of varying nationalities, and motives, all attempt to find a wayward and drug-addicted elephant in the Norwegian wilderness before the others do. The film explores a wide number of themes including addiction, drug abuse, freedom, nature, tragedy, crime, materialism, urban decay, animal cruelty and animal rights.

It was Norway's first computer animated film. Costing in excess of 120 million Norwegian kroner it is the second most expensive Norwegian film to date, behind Max Manus. Several British CGI studios were involved in the production of the film, although the film was mostly a Norwegian production. The voice actors for the original Norwegian version included Kristopher Schau, Jan Sælid, Are&Odin, Egil Birkeland, Terje Ragner, Anders T. Andersen and Mikkel Gaup.

British comedy writer and actor Simon Pegg wrote a screenplay for the wider English-speaking world which was subsequently released straight to DVD on 7 October 2008 by BreakThru Films. The voice actors of the 2008 English-language version is made up of an international ensemble cast that includes Pegg himself, Woody Harrelson, Phil Daniels, Jay Simpson, Jim Broadbent, James Cosmo, David Tennant, Steve Pemberton, Reece Shearsmith, Mark Gatiss, Megan Dodds, Douglas Henshall, Kris Marshall, Emilia Fox, Samantha Morton, Kyle MacLachlan and Lisa Maxwell.

The film is dedicated to Joachim Nielsen (1964–2000), the director's brother and a rock musician famous in his native Norway, who had died of a drug overdose after quitting them successfully for many years. Whilst well received in its native country, reception to Free Jimmy has been generally negative in the English-speaking world.

Plot

The events of the original movie take place entirely in Norway; in the English-language version of the movie, the story begins in Britain and ends up in Norway with the travelling Russian circus.

At night, an animal testing laboratory in grimy downtown Oslo, Norway is broken into by a bumbling group of guerilla vegan animal rights activists called True Warriors Against Animal Torture and Subjugation (TWAATS). They first release some rabbits which refuse to leave. They then set the rats free, then the cats, which to the horror of the activists, eat the rats. Again to their horror, their dog Karma kills the cats. They bury the dead animals, vowing to at some point take revenge on "animal oppressing" society.

Meanwhile, three inept Cockney English stoner habitual criminals named Odd, Gaz and Flea (Odd, Geir and Kælle in the Norwegian version) watch a news story about the lab break-in at a decrepit apartment. Their shady Southern American friend Roy Arnie (a fellow Norwegian childhood friend in the original) arrives and offers them a job opportunity with Circus Stromowski, a travelling Russian circus led by Ringmaster Igor Stromowski. As they are in debt with Roy Arnie, trying to escape a local gangster named Ivan, and believe it is lucrative, they agree. However, upon arriving at the circus, they find Stromowski to be incompetent and deranged, and the entire circus is full of useless, miserable has-beens and tired animals that are forced to perform under the influence of narcotics. They are supposed to work as the animal handlers. The star attraction is "Jimmy", a captive large male elephant who is paranoid of police, missing half his tusk, and addicted to drugs. Roy Arnie gives Jimmy speed so he can perform spiritedly for spectators, and gives him heroin at night to sedate him.

Roy admits to the others that he has stolen seven kilograms of heroin worth over a million pounds from a tanker owned by the Russian Mafias, whom he joined the circus to escape from. The four plan to smuggle the heroin out of Norway by making an incision in Jimmy's buttocks, placing the bags of drugs inside and then sewing it back up. Roy Arnie plans to found his own circus using the money and believes Jimmy to be the key to his dream. However, on the night where they plan to steal the elephant, Jimmy escapes when he is accidentally given speed instead of heroin and bolts out of a door left open by TWAATS. Flea steals a van with no windshield in the ensuing chase of Jimmy which leads them up into the frozen moorland.

Three Lappish Mafia motorbikers dressed in traditional Sámi garb clothes part of the notorious "Laplander motorcycle gang" who have been hired by the Russian Mafias and are looking for the heroin and revenge on Roy Arnie tail the lads. The bikers overhear their conversation and learn the drugs are stored in Jimmy, and decide to pursue him first. Meanwhile, the TWAATS pursue him, intending to make him an animal rights symbol, but two abandon them, tired walking through the moorlands on foot. Jimmy is also hunted by a group of trigger-happy and redneck-type Scottish big game hunters (trøndere in the Norwegian version) who want to shoot a larger animal. The four stoners find a log cabin which is occupied by an elderly Asian-American couple but the three Lappish Mafia motorbikers find them there, kill the couple and torture the four stoners for the information on the whereabouts of Jimmy the elephant.

In the moors, Jimmy is close to death and suffering withdrawal when a benevolent moose befriends him and helps him by leading him to water, bringing him food, and providing shelter. The moose supports Jimmy to stand up on his own. Over the course of a few painful days with the moose's help, Jimmy recovers in nature away from exploiting humans.

When the groups find Jimmy, chaos ensues resulting in many of the people dying mostly violent, bloody deaths. The moose distracts the hunters who accidentally shoot a motorbiker - the other two and activist Marius die when he throws a grenade in the middle of a fall. Roy Arnie tries attract Jimmy with drugs, but he refuses and intimidates them. As Jimmy and the moose try to leave, Jimmy steps on Karma, splatting him. The naive, high-strung, grief-stricken activist Sonia loses her temper and shoots Jimmy in his incision using one of the hunters' rifles, unwittingly bursting the bags of heroin inside that quickly kills Jimmy from the massive drug overdose. Sonia recoils in horror and flees amidst her nervous breakdown with the other only surviving activist.

The stoners attempt to retrieve the heroin from Jimmy's corpse. The moose pushes some rocks which cause a landslide that buries Jimmy's body so his corpse can't be exploited. The stoners leave. At the mound entombing Jimmy, the moose poignantly mourns then gallops away into the sunset alone. Back at their apartment home, the three stoners assault Roy Arnie for leading them to the situation because of his circus dreams. Finally, Roy, full of remorse over his past actions, ventures to the moors alone to search for Jimmy. Roy disappears into a terrible blizzard calling out "Jimmy" in vain.

English-language version

Overview
The plot of the English-language version of the film remains virtually unchanged to the original in Norwegian. The audio track is dubbed over with English voices, with contemporary British dialogue written by Simon Pegg, and Pegg receives credit in the screenplay. It was released on DVD on 7 October 2008, by BreakThru Films, with Bill Godfrey as Executive Producer.

Unlike the original which was released in cinemas in Norway, Free Jimmy was a direct-to-video release in the English speaking world.

Although only the audio has been changed in the English-language version, the new dialogue makes for some changes to the original Norwegian film. For example, Roy, Odd, Flea and Baz are cockneys from London instead of east enders from Oslo in Norway (that curiously enough has a similar working class type of sociolect as cockneys from east London). The rest of the film does however still take place in Norway, as the Londoners end up there anyway as they travel with the touring Russian circus. Other significant plot changes are obvious, such as other characters are made British instead of Norwegian, and the redneck-type hunting party are apparently Scottish in the English-language version.

Cast
The voice actors of the English-language version make up an international ensemble cast that include:

Themes
Free Jimmy explores a wide number of themes including addiction, drug abuse, freedom, nature, tragedy, crime, materialism, urban decay, animal cruelty and animal rights.

Release

Film festival premieres
 The 2006 Cannes Film Festival in Cannes, France – May 25, 2006
 The Helsinki International Film Festival in Helsinki, Finland – September 15, 2006
 The Hong Kong International Film Festival in Hong Kong, China – March 20, 2007
 The Copenhagen Film Festival for Children and Youth in Copenhagen, Denmark – September 16, 2007
 The Waterloo Festival for Animated Cinema in Waterloo, Ontario, Canada – November 18, 2007
 The Busan International Film Festival in Busan, South Korea – October 20, 2006
 The Palm Springs International Film Festival in Palm Springs, California in the USA – January 15, 2007

Theatrical releases
Free Jimmy was theatrically released in Norway on April 21, 2006, Finland on November 17, 2006, Sweden on April 27, 2007, Russia on November 22, 2007, the United Kingdom on October 17, 2008 and the Netherlands on January 28, 2010.

DVD release in the United Kingdom
Free Jimmy was released on DVD in the United Kingdom on January 22, 2010 by Granada Ventures.

Reception

Box office
Free Jimmy grossed $2.3 million worldwide.

Critical response

Free Jimmy has an approval rating of  based on  reviews from aggregate ratings site Rotten Tomatoes. The website's critical consensus reads, "A weird, misfiring, Norwegian animated mess of a film. Unsure of who its target audience is, it misses every target." Xan Brooks of The Guardian described it as "joyless" and those who watch it to be "dumb animals themselves" and wrote "Free Jimmy is a sledgehammer Norwegian animation that metes out all manner of cruelty to dumb animals, not least the ones in the audience." Many Norwegian fans noted that depth of story was missing in the new version and that the overall message of the film and the original ironic humour had been lost in translation and the target audience had become unclear.

Richard Luck of Film4 wrote "Norway may be wonderful for many things but feature-length animation currently isn't one of them." James Christopher of Times (UK) called the film "deeply unhinged" and "deeply awful". Tim Evans of Sky Cinema gave the film one out of five stars and wrote "They say an elephant never forgets. But even the most anally-retentive pachyderm would be desperate to banish this misfiring mess to the darkest reaches of memory." Anthony Quinn of Independent (UK) also gave the film one out of five stars and wrote "The brief relationship that the escaped elephant forms with a resourceful moose is oddly touching, but the fatuities surrounding it ensure that any deeper involvement is unlikely." Derek Malcolm of The London Evening Standard gave the film two out of five stars and wrote "But the characters don't add to the conception. Nor does the basic animation." Leslie Felperin of Variety wrote "Pic could be too dark, dirty and insufficiently funny to achieve more than cult success." Derek Adams of Time Out London gave Free Jimmy three out of six stars, saying: "This adult-orientated, computer-generated animation isn't an especially successful outing but still serves as an impressive antidote to the Disney-Pixar norm."

Accolades

References

External links
 
 Official homepage – English version
 Official homepage – Norwegian version

2006 films
2006 computer-animated films
2000s Norwegian-language films
2000s English-language films
Animated films based on comics
Animated films about elephants
2006 black comedy films
Norwegian satirical films
Norwegian animated films
British computer-animated films
Films about animal rights
Films about drugs
Films scored by Simon Boswell
Films with screenplays by Simon Pegg
Films based on Norwegian comics
Films set in Norway
Annecy Cristal for a Feature Film winners
2006 comedy films
2006 multilingual films
Norwegian multilingual films
British multilingual films
British adult animated films
2000s British films